Alcaligenes aestus is a bacterium from the genus Alcaligenes.

References

Burkholderiales
Bacteria described in 1972